Lower Waterford is an unincorporated village in the town of Waterford, Caledonia County, Vermont, United States. Lower Waterford has a post office with ZIP code 05848, which opened on February 9, 1830.

References

Unincorporated communities in Caledonia County, Vermont
Unincorporated communities in Vermont